Amsterdam Island (French: Île Amsterdam) is a French island in the Indian Ocean

Amsterdam Island may also refer to:

Amsterdam Island, West Papua, an island in West Papua
Amsterdam Island (Spitsbergen), a Norwegian island in the Arctic Ocean
Tongatapu, an island of Tonga, once named Amsterdam
Untung Jawa (Amsterdam Island), an island off the coast of Java

See also
Amsterdam (disambiguation)
New Amsterdam (disambiguation)